In computing, comp is a command used on DEC OS/8, DOS, DR FlexOS, IBM OS/2, Microsoft Windows and related computer operating systems such as ReactOS. It is used to perform comparisons of multiple computer files to show the differences between them.

History
 
In DOS, the comp command first appeared in PC DOS 1.0 and has been included in most versions of MS-DOS and PC DOS. A newer command, fc was added in DOS 3.3 which allows for line comparisons in addition to binary comparisons. DR DOS 6.0 also includes an implementation of the  command.

The FreeDOS version was developed by Paul Vojta and is licensed under the MIT License. Ged Murphy developed the ReactOS version. It is licensed under the GNU GPL 2.

The command is also available in the EFI shell.

Syntax
The command-syntax is:
 comp [<Data1>] [<Data2>] [/d] [/a] [/l] [/n=<Number>] [/c]

Parameters
<Data1> – Location and name of the first file or set of files
<Data2> – Location and name of the second file or set of files
/d – Display differences in decimal format (Default is hexadecimal)
/a – Display differences as characters
/l – Display the number of the line, instead of the byte offset
/n=<Number> – Compare only the specified number of lines for each file
/c – Perform a non case-sensitive comparison
/off[line] – Process files with the offline attribute set
/? – Display Help

See also
 Data comparison
 List of DOS commands
 diff

References

Further reading

External links

comp | Microsoft Docs

External DOS commands
OS/2 commands
ReactOS commands
File comparison tools